Soul Stealer is a graphic novel written by Michael Easton, with art by Christopher Shy and published by Black Watch Comics. It was named Graphic Novel of the Year by 'Ain't it Cool News in 2010. Soul Stealer is an explicit tale of horror and fantasy that follows the pieced-together, Frankenstein-like hero, Kalan, on a centuries-long search for his eternal love, the beautiful Oxania.

Author
Michael Easton acted on TV shows such as VR5, 413 Hope Street, Total Recall 2070 and Ally McBeal and is preparing a second volume of poetry. His first was titled Eighteen Straight Whiskeys. His next graphic novel, Credence, will be released in the fall of 2013 by Black Watch Comics. In 2015, he wrote and directed a short film called Ultraviolent, which won the Best Of Show Award at the Best Shorts Competition.

In 2009, Easton collaborated with Peter Straub on the graphic novel The Green Woman for Vertigo. The book included art by John Bolton.

Artist
Christopher Shy gained popularity with the release of Pathfinder for Dark Horse Comics. His most recent work is Dead Space: Salvage for IDW and The North End of the World for Black Watch Comics. He is the founder of Studio Ronin.

Editor/Letterer
Leah Novak has been an active professional comic book Letterer and Creative Editor in the field for over 11 years. She has worked on many independent graphic novels and comic books, as well as editing Dead Space for EA. She continues to work with Michael Easton on various projects.

Reviews
Keith Howell for Ain’t It Cool News said, "It will be one of the most profound experiences you will ever remember in sitting back to read a graphic novel."

References

Horror graphic novels
Fantasy graphic novels